Dry Fork is a rural unincorporated community in southern Barren County, Kentucky, United States.

References

Unincorporated communities in Barren County, Kentucky
Unincorporated communities in Kentucky